The 2012–13 Stephen F. Austin Lumberjacks basketball team represented Stephen F. Austin University during the 2012–13 NCAA Division I men's basketball season. The Lumberjacks, led by 13th year head coach Danny Kaspar, played their home games at the William R. Johnson Coliseum and were members of the Southland Conference. They finished the season 27–5, 16–2 in Southland play to win the Southland regular season championship. They advanced to the championship game of the Southland tournament where they lost to Northwestern State. As a regular season conference champion who failed to win their conference tournament, they received an automatic bid to the 2013 NIT where they lost in the first round to Stanford.

Roster

Schedule

|-
!colspan=9| Regular season

|-
!colspan=9| 2013 Southland tournament

|-
!colspan=9| 2013 NIT

References

Stephen F. Austin Lumberjacks basketball seasons
Stephen F. Austin
Stephen F. Austin
Stephen F. Austin Lumberjacks basketball
Stephen F. Austin Lumberjacks basketball